Sjeng Kerbusch (1947 - 1 March 1991) was a Dutch behavior geneticist.

A native of Maastricht, he obtained his Ph.D. from the Catholic University Nijmegen in 1974 as the third Dutchman in this field. Kerbusch' specialism was the application of quantitative-genetic methods, especially diallel crosses and Mendelian crosses, to the analysis of behavior. From 1984-1987, he was President of the Dutch Behavior Genetics Contact Group and in 1988 he was local host for the 18th Annual Meeting of the Behavior Genetics Association held in Nijmegen, The Netherlands. Kerbusch died at Nijmegen from complications after a lung transplant.

Notable publications

References 

1947 births
1991 deaths
Behavior geneticists
People from Maastricht
Dutch geneticists
Dutch psychologists
20th-century psychologists
20th-century Dutch zoologists